This article is about the particular significance of the year 1825 to Wales and its people.

Incumbents
Lord Lieutenant of Anglesey – Henry Paget, 1st Marquess of Anglesey 
Lord Lieutenant of Brecknockshire – Henry Somerset, 6th Duke of Beaufort
Lord Lieutenant of Caernarvonshire – Thomas Assheton Smith
Lord Lieutenant of Cardiganshire – William Edward Powell
Lord Lieutenant of Carmarthenshire – George Rice, 3rd Baron Dynevor 
Lord Lieutenant of Denbighshire – Sir Watkin Williams-Wynn, 5th Baronet    
Lord Lieutenant of Flintshire – Robert Grosvenor, 1st Marquess of Westminster 
Lord Lieutenant of Glamorgan – John Crichton-Stuart, 2nd Marquess of Bute 
Lord Lieutenant of Merionethshire – Sir Watkin Williams-Wynn, 5th Baronet
Lord Lieutenant of Montgomeryshire – Edward Clive, 1st Earl of Powis
Lord Lieutenant of Pembrokeshire – Sir John Owen, 1st Baronet
Lord Lieutenant of Radnorshire – George Rodney, 3rd Baron Rodney

Bishop of Bangor – Henry Majendie 
Bishop of Llandaff – William Van Mildert
Bishop of St Asaph – John Luxmoore 
Bishop of St Davids – Thomas Burgess (until 17 June); John Jenkinson (from 24 July)

Events
2 January – The square-rigged transatlantic ocean liner Diamond strikes Sarn Badrig in Cardigan Bay and sinks.
unknown dates
The first public wharves are built at Portmadoc.
Rails for the Stockton and Darlington Railway (opened 27 September) are made at Ebbw Vale.
Publication of Seren Gomer moves to Carmarthen.
Sir Thomas Foley becomes an admiral.

Arts and literature

New books

English language
John Brickdale Blakeway and Hugh Owen – A History of Shrewsbury
Felicia Hemans – The Forest Sanctuary

Welsh language
John Davies (Brychan) – Y Gog
Peter Bailey Williams – Tragwyddol Orphwysfa'r Saint

Music
Jedediah Richards – Diddanwch y Pererinion

Births
15 January – Eleazar Roberts, writer and musician (d. 1912)
25 January – Robert Piercy, civil engineer (d. 1894)
7 June – R. D. Blackmore, English novelist of Anglo-Welsh parentage (d. 1900)

Deaths
12 February – John Humffreys Parry, antiquary, 39 (in a tavern brawl)
24 February – Thomas Bowdler, editor, 70
16 April – Hugh Jones (Maesglasau), hymn-writer, 75
2 May – Michael Hughes, industrialist, 72
9 June – Abraham Rees, encyclopaedist, 81
10 August – Joseph Harris (Gomer), Baptist minister, poet and editor, 52
12 September – Sir Thomas Stepney, 9th Baronet, groom of the bedchamber to Prince Frederick, Duke of York and Albany and last of his line, 65

References

 
Wales
 Wales